Travis Brown (born August 7, 1969) is an American professional bicycle racer.  He competes in cross-country mountain bike and cyclo-cross races but has also raced on road bicycles.

External links
Travis Brown bio on Trek Bikes page
News release on Trek Bikes showing Travis' tattoo from his 2002 SSWC win

1969 births
American male cyclists
Living people
Cyclo-cross cyclists
Cyclists at the 2000 Summer Olympics
Olympic cyclists of the United States
Cross-country mountain bikers
Place of birth missing (living people)
American mountain bikers